"Come On Over Baby (All I Want Is You)" is a song recorded by American singer Christina Aguilera for her 1999 self-titled debut studio album. Released as the album's fourth and final single on July 11, 2000, by RCA Records, it was the first song over which Aguilera was given significant creative control. "Come On Over Baby (All I Want Is You)" was written by Johan Åberg and Paul Rein, with Aguilera, Ron Fair, Chaka Blackmon, Raymond Cham, Eric Dawkins, Shelly Peiken and Guy Roche contributing to a re-recorded version. The album version of the song was produced by Aaron Zigman, Åberg and Rein, while the re-recorded version was produced by Fair and Celebrity Status.

Upon its release, "Come On Over Baby (All I Want Is You)" achieved international commercial success and critical acclaim. In the United States, it became Aguilera's third number-one hit on the Billboard Hot 100. The single also reached top-ten positions in several countries including Australia and the United Kingdom, and reached number one in Venezuela and Guatemala. The accompanying music video for "Come On Over Baby (All I Want Is You)" saw Aguilera experiment with her image, beginning an evolution of reinventions seen in the ensuing years of her career.

A Spanish-language version of the song was adapted by Rudy Pérez titled "Ven Conmigo (Solamente Tú)" which was recorded for Aguilera's Spanish-language follow up album, Mi Reflejo (2000). "Ven Conmigo (Solamente Tú)" was released to Latin radio stations in the United States on August 8, 2000. It became a top ten hit in Spain, and a top five hit in El Salvador, Paraguay and Honduras.

Background and recording

Like "What a Girl Wants" (the second single from the Christina Aguilera album), a new remixed and re-recorded version of "Come On Over Baby (All I Want Is You)" was released as a single rather than the original album version. The album version, which had been known simply as "Come On Over (All I Want Is You)", was seen as unsuitable for a single release.

The single version of "Come On Over (All I Want Is You)" was transformed into "Come On Over Baby (All I Want Is You)" with new and more sexual lyrics, a chord progression for the song's B-section, a bridge, a "rap" from Aguilera, a new mid-song dance breakdown, and more powerful vocals by Aguilera were also added. The song also features limited new elements from Shelly Peiken and Guy Roche. The original album version has no bridge, so it had previously been performed live with an interlude that sampled the disco classic "Got to Be Real" by Cheryl Lynn. However, when the original songwriters of "Got to Be Real" were contacted for permission to sample their song, they denied clearance. Instead, Aguilera's team substituted a reference to "What a Girl Wants". Aguilera helped write the song's controversial and slightly sexual rap section from the re-recorded version. This rap (and also a section in the second verse in which Aguilera discusses sexuality and a man's hands on her body) caused Radio Disney to ban the song initially, as it had done with "Genie in a Bottle". The original album version of the song was allowed to be played, and an edited version of "Come On Over Baby (All I Want Is You)", which removed the second verse and rap, was also given some airplay. Reportedly, the re-recorded version received more airplay on the station than the album version of the song.

Composition
"Come On Over Baby (All I Want Is You)" is written in the key of E major with a tempo of 119 beats per minute in common time. The song follows a chord progression of EE/GAB, and Aguilera's vocals span from B3 to B4.

Critical reception
Stephen Thomas Erlewine of AllMusic highlighted the English version on the singer's self-titled album. Billboards Mia Nazareno called the song a "Radio Disney-approved bop" and complimented its "addictive", "danceable" sound. In December 2000, Kai R. Lofthus of Music & Media ranked it as one of the five best songs of the year.

CDNow senior editor Eliseo Cardona wrote about Spanish version: "Indeed, the overly literal Spanish lyrics make for both a good laugh and a better yawn. This point is unwittingly made on 'Ven conmigo (Solamente tú),' the translation of 'Come on Over (All I Want Is You)'. If Spanish pop seems to make no sense at times, then this takes nonsense to the next level." A complete opposite opinion came from Wall of Sound editor Kurt B. Reighley; to him it sounds "especially sassy en Español." Parry Gettelman of Orlando Sentinel praised the vocals calling them "out-of-my-way." Sun-Sentinel music writer Sean Piccoli wrote: "Ven Conmigo (Come with Me) borrows its bounce from the better Whitney–Mariah numbers." In August 2020, Billboard named the song one of the "best 2000's Latin hits". It has been called "one of Aguilera's greatest hits" by Rolling Stone en Español.

Chart performance
"Come on Over Baby (All I Want Is You)" became Aguilera's third number-one hit on the U.S. Billboard Hot 100, and was certified Platinum by RIAA, as well selling over 500,000 physical units in the country. It spent twenty-one weeks on the Hot 100, four of which were atop the chart, and ranked thirty-eighth on the Hot 100's 2000 year-end charts. After receiving a strong push from the record label and Aguilera herself, the single became a big hit. It had a stronger airplay than "What a Girl Wants", and its video became Aguilera's most popular to date, receiving strong airplay on MTV, VH1, Disney and Nickelodeon.

"Come on Over Baby (All I Want Is You)" reached the top ten in the UK, Japan and Australia and the top twenty in Canada, but was less successful in Continental Europe, reaching the top forty in most markets. It placed at number three in Iceland, number four in Hungary, number six in the Netherlands, number seven in Croatia, as well as number nine in Ireland, Poland and Scotland. On the UK Singles Chart the song peaked at number eight. The single became yet another international success for Aguilera, reaching #2 in New Zealand, where it stayed on the charts for thirteen weeks. The single was also certified Platinum in Australia. "Come on Over" stayed at #1 on Billboard for four weeks, and stayed on the Australian charts for twenty weeks.

The Spanish-language version of the single, "Ven Conmigo (Solamente Tú)", sticking to the original arrangement, was also a huge Latin music success, becoming Aguilera's first number-one single on Billboard's Hot Latin Tracks chart. It peaked at number two in El Salvador and Honduras, as well as number nine in Uruguay, as reported by El Siglo de Torreón. In Spain, it spent ten weeks at the PROMUSICAE's singles chart, debuting at number fourteen and eventually peaking at number eight on December 9, 2000. The original version of "Come on Over Baby" also achieved commercial success in Latin America, reaching the top spot in Guatemala and Venezuela.

Music video
The music video for the song was directed by Paul Hunter and choreographed by Tina Landon. The video was shot from June 12–15, 2000 and premiered in late July on MTV's Making the Video. It featured a racier image from Aguilera. Unlike her previous singles, she had red streaks in her hair and wore tighter clothing. The image Aguilera used in "Come on Over Baby (All I Want Is You)" was also used for Mi Reflejo and her first headlining tour in 2000. The music video for "Come on Over Baby (All I Want Is You)" was an instant hit, shooting to #1 on TRL in August 2000. When the music video aired on Disney Channel, some scenes were edited out and some of the sexual lyrics were censored. A second version of the video was released for the Spanish version of the song, "Ven Conmigo (Solamente Tú)". In this version, most scenes and choreography are parallel to the original, but Aguilera also appears singing next to a red chair.

Synopsis

The music video begins with Aguilera talking on the phone with her boyfriend, telling him to come over to her house. After she hangs up the phone, the scene breaks out into Aguilera wearing a white crop top and white pants, with red streaks in her hair. In the next scene, Aguilera has loose braided pigtails, a blue crop top, and blue and white checkered pants. She is in her bedroom, when suddenly she and her backup dancers begin dancing in front of a white background. The male dancers come out, and begin dancing with the female dancers. After that, Aguilera and her then-real life boyfriend Jorge Santos dance together with her backup dancers in the scene where everyone is wearing yellow and green outfits, first in a yellow-green background followed by a yellow-orange background. The next scene is where her dancers dance on chairs in white open-faced cubes, intercut with Aguilera singing in a blue-walled background and a white drapery background. Aguilera and her backup dancers then dance in front of a white background. It cuts into a scene where Aguilera walks down a flight of steps in a red room, with her backup dancers on each step. They begin dancing again, and Aguilera's backup dancers hold up pieces of puzzle paper that shows Aguilera's face.

Live performances

Aguilera performed "Come on Over Baby" in her tour Christina Aguilera: Live in Concert, an acoustic version on the Stripped World Tour, and a jazz version on the Back to Basics Tour. In the second leg of her "Christina Aguilera: In Concert", where she visited Puerto Rico, México, Venezuela, Panama and Japan, she replaced the song for the Spanish version of it "Ven Conmigo (Solamente Tú)". She also performed this version and "Pero Me Acuerdo de Ti" in Mexican comedy and variety show Otro Rollo. Aguilera performed "Come on Over Baby (All I Want is You)" at the 2000 MTV Video Music Awards on September 7, 2000. She wore a striking red tight outfit, with black streaks in her hair previous to how she wore them in her music video, red high heels, and a tight ruby red crop top. At the end of Aguilera's performance, Fred Durst walked onstage and performed part of his band's song "Livin' It Up" with Aguilera. During the ceremony, Aguilera wore a revealing black outfit with black heels. After eliciting charged reactions from his fans, Durst stated: "I already told you guys before, I did it all for the nookie, man". The feud died weeks later. Aguilera denied Durst's statement, saying Durst "got no nookie".

Usage in media
In 2000, Aguilera performed the Spanish version of the song "Ven Conmigo (Solamente Tú)" in the Telecinco's teen series Al salir de clase, where she also portrayed herself. The song was used in the 2022 Netflix comedy film Senior Year, starring Rebel Wilson.

Covers
Mexican singer and actress Lucero performed "Ven Conmigo (Solamente Tú)" in her 32nd anniversary concert along with her team on La Voz... México; the performance was viewed by around ten thousand spectators. In the Peruvian show Yo Soy contestant Katherine Vega covered the song personifying Aguilera. This version was also used for a Coca-Cola commercial airing all over Latin America. The Spanish version of the song was also played in the film Spanglish while Cristina Moreno (Shelbie Bruce) is in the living room with the radio on and is featured in the soundtrack of the film.

Track listing
Major tracks released for "Come on Over Baby (All I Want Is You)".US CD and cassette single"Come on Over Baby (All I Want Is You)"  – 3:40
"Ven Conmigo (Solamente Tú)" – 3:12

UK maxi-CD
"Come on Over Baby"  – 3:23
"Come on Over Baby"  – 5:42
"Come on Over Baby"  – 4:28
"Come on Over (All I Want Is You)"  – 3:08
"Come on Over Baby" (enhanced video)

Australian CD single
"Come on Over Baby (All I Want Is You)"  – 3:23
"Ven Conmigo (Solamente Tú)" – 3:12
"I Turn to You"  – 4:07

UK 12" vinyl
"Come on Over Baby (All I Want Is You)"  – 5:44
"Come on Over Baby (All I Want Is You)"  – 5:08
"Come on Over Baby (All I Want Is You)"  – 4:28
"Come on Over Baby (All I Want Is You)"  – 4:28US double A-side single (2001)'
"Genie in a Bottle" - 3:36
"Come on Over Baby (All I Want Is You)"  – 3:40
"Genie in a Bottle"  - 4:26

Charts

Weekly charts

Year-end charts

Certifications and sales

Release history

See also
List of Billboard Hot 100 number-one singles of 2000
List of number-one Billboard Hot Latin Tracks of 2000
List of number-one Billboard Latin Tropical Airplay of 2000

Notes

References

2000 songs
2000 singles
Christina Aguilera songs
Billboard Hot 100 number-one singles
Music videos directed by Paul Hunter (director)
Songs written by Christina Aguilera
Songs written by Shelly Peiken
Songs written by Guy Roche
Songs written by Ron Fair
Songs written by Johan Åberg
Song recordings produced by Ron Fair
RCA Records singles
Song recordings produced by Rudy Pérez
Songs written by Eric Dawkins
Songs written by Paul Rein